The Serbian Orthodox Eparchy of Eastern America or Serbian Orthodox Diocese of Eastern America is a Serbian Orthodox Church diocese of the United States. Before 1984 it was known as the Serbian Orthodox Eparchy of Eastern America and Canada.

History
The Serbian Orthodox Eparchy of Eastern America was first created in 1983 by dividing the Serbian Orthodox Eparchy of Eastern America and Canada in two separate eparchies: Serbian Orthodox Eparchy of Eastern America and Serbian Orthodox Eparchy of Canada.

The Holy Assembly of Bishops of 1991 ceded areas in South America to this diocese. In South America and the Caribbean the Diocese of Eastern America has churches in Argentina, Brazil, Venezuela, Chile, Ecuador, Peru, and Dominican Republic.

On May 26, 2011, by the decision of the Holy Council of Bishops of the Serbian Orthodox Church, parishes in South and Central America were allocated in the new Eparchy of Buenos Aires.

The diocese operates 58 churches and parishes and monasteries in the United States in Florida, Georgia, Maine, Massachusetts, New Hampshire, New Jersey, New York, North Carolina, Ohio, Maryland, Pennsylvania, Virginia and West Virginia. A parish in Maryland serves residents of the District of Columbia.

See also

Eparchies:
 Serbian Orthodox Church in North and South America
 Serbian Orthodox Eparchy of New Gračanica and Midwestern America
 Serbian Orthodox Eparchy of Western America
Serbian Orthodox Eparchy of Buenos Aires and South America
Churches:
 Trinity Chapel Complex
Monasteries:
 Shadeland: Most Holy Mother Of God Serbian Orthodox Monastery (Springboro, Pennsylvania)
 Sheffield Village: St. Mark Serbian Orthodox Monastery (Sheffield, Ohio)
 Richfield: Synaxis of St. Archangel Gabriel Serbian Orthodox Monastery New Marcha Richfield, Ohio)
 St. Nikolaj of Žiča (China, Michigan)

References

Sources

External links
 Diocese of Eastern America

Religious sees of the Serbian Orthodox Church
Serbian Orthodox Church in the United States
Serbian-American history